Vathiri (Tamil: வதிரி) is a small town in Jaffna district in the Northern Province of Sri Lanka.

Etymology

History

See also
List of towns in Northern Province, Sri Lanka
www.vathiri.com

External links

Populated places in Northern Province, Sri Lanka